The Marshlink line is a railway line in South East England. It runs from Ashford, Kent via Romney Marsh, Rye and the Ore Tunnel to Hastings where it connects to the East Coastway line towards Eastbourne. Services are provided by Southern.

The line was constructed by the South Eastern Railway (SER) in the late 1840s, and was considered politically important. The SER clashed with the rival London, Brighton and South Coast Railway, leading to disputes over the route, planning and operation. After delays, the line opened in February 1851, followed by branch lines to Rye Harbour in 1854, Dungeness in 1881 and New Romney in 1884. The line struggled to be profitable and it seemed likely that it would close as recommended by the Beeching Report. All branch lines were closed to passengers by 1967 but the main line was kept open because of poor road connections in the area, and the branch to Dungeness remained open for freight. Though the line has been partially single-tracked, and was slow to be modernised, it has survived into the 21st century.

The Marshlink line is one of the few in South East England that has not been electrified, despite regular proposals to do so, and uses the British Rail Class 171 diesel rolling stock. Despite its relative unimportance in the national rail network, it is now considered politically significant as electrification could allow High Speed 1 services to be extended to Hastings and Eastbourne.

Name
The name "Marshlink" was first used in the 1970s by the Southern region of British Rail in an attempt to improve marketing, painting the name on selected rolling stock.

Route
Services run from Platforms 1 and 2 southwards. Following a brief section of single-track immediately after a branch from the South Eastern Main Line, the line is then double-track. After , it descends on a  gradient towards  (previously Ham Street & Orlsetone), crossing the Royal Military Canal and entering Romney Marsh towards . The next 13 miles through Romney Marsh and the Brede Valley are level track, aside from a handful of river crossings.

South of Appledore, a freight-only branch line operated by Direct Rail Services diverges to serve Dungeness nuclear power station. The branch originally served New Romney,  and Dungeness.

Beyond Appledore, the line is single track and after crossing the River Rother reaches  where there is a disused branch to Rye Harbour. The line passes through the former  (closed in 1959),  and  before entering the  Ore Tunnel.

After the tunnel, the line is double track and electrified (originally for access to the carriage sidings at Ore but since their removal the lines are used by scheduled trains). After , the line enters the  Mount Pleasant Tunnel before a  descent towards Hastings.

The Marshlink line does not follow any particular roads. The nearest equivalent route for road transport is the A259 from Hastings to Folkestone via Rye.

Services

Passenger services are operated by Southern. Trains run hourly between Ashford International and Hastings, stopping at Ham Street, Appledore and Rye. Winchelsea and Three Oaks are served by a two-hourly service in each direction (alternating between one and the other), while Doleham is served by just three or four trains per day each way.

At peak times, an additional hourly shuttle runs between Ashford and Rye.

Ore station, in addition to Ashford-Eastbourne services, receives services to Brighton and London (hourly to each), which start or terminate there. The services use electric multiple units (usually Class 377s).

Ham Street, Appledore and Rye have staggered platforms: this once allowed passengers to cross the line from the end of one platform to the end of the other. Platforms at Three Oaks and Doleham can only accommodate a single carriage and passengers wishing to alight must travel in one particular carriage of the train.

History

Construction

The line was originally the idea of the Brighton, Lewes and Hastings Railway (BLHR), founded in June 1844 to construct a link between those three towns in association with the London and Brighton Railway (LBR). The South Eastern Railway (SER) wanted to construct a line between Headcorn, Rye and Hastings, but the Parliamentary Select Committee thought there would be insufficient traffic to justify it. After an Act of Parliament was passed to construct the Brighton–Hastings line (now the East Coastway line), the LBR thought it would be useful to extend it further towards Rye and Ashford, which was an area otherwise dominated by SER plans. The SER conducted their own survey from Ashford to Rye in the hope that they would be allowed to construct and own the line instead.

During the 1844–45 Parliamentary session, the Board of Trade decided to approve the BLHR's plans. The SER were unhappy about this arrangement and during the summer of 1845 abandoned their Headcorn–Rye–Hastings scheme, focusing on Hastings–Rye–Ashford instead. The two companies reached a compromise, by which the BLHR were authorised to build the line from Hastings to Ashford, with a caveat that the SER could take over operation if they wished. The proposed line passed through countryside with only Rye as a significant settlement, so the SER easily managed to persuade the BLHR to hand over construction rights.

In June 1846, Parliament deemed that the line was of strategic military importance and ordered that it was to be completed before the extension of the Hastings line from Tunbridge Wells to Hastings. As part of the contract, the SER had to pay £10,000 towards refurbishing Rye Harbour, and took responsibility for drainage of the Royal Military Canal which ran close to the line along Romney Marsh.

On 27 July 1846, the LBR and BLHR amalgamated with several other lines to form the London, Brighton and South Coast Railway (LB&SCR). They became fierce rivals with the SER and complained about a lack of sufficient progress. The SER were unhappy about the proposed line from Rye to Hastings via , which they viewed as too expensive compared to the alternative route via Whatlington. The LB&SCR objected to this route as it was longer, and consequently the SER dropped their proposals that November.

In July 1847, George Robert Stephenson designed a bridge across the Royal Military Canal near Warehorne, while Peter W. Barlow designed a swing bridge over the River Rother at Rye. However, the specific route continued to be debated by the SER throughout early 1848. Work from the Ashford–Rye section started in earnest that summer, making quick progress. The land over Romney Marsh was unstable, and test trains were seen to tip over in heavy winds. The line was planned as single-track, though this was changed to double-track in June 1850.

The line was intended to be opened on 28 October 1850 by Thomas Farncombe, Lord Mayor of London, who inserted the last brick in both the Ore and Mount Pleasant tunnels, but not all work had been completed so the full ceremony was postponed. A second proposed opening date of 1 January 1851 was cancelled following signalling problems. The line eventually opened on 13 February 1851, though this was hampered by the rivalries between the companies. The SER blocked LB&SCR trains entering Hastings, not recognising them as the legal successors to the BLH. After a court case the two companies agreed to share the station's facilities for both lines. Even after opening, there were complaints in early 1852 that the line was not completely finished, and it was still marked "nearly complete" in March 1853.

The railway opened with four intermediate stations between Ashford and Hastings at Ham Street, Appledore, Rye and Winchelsea. There were almost no other places of significance along the line. Four trains per day ran each way on the line, reducing to two on Sundays. Few changes were made to the railway after construction during the 19th century, aside from minor signalling work and some additional buildings. It was not declared profitable by the SER until 1895.

To make money and boost traffic on the line, the SER agreed to hold unlicensed boxing matches on Romney Marsh. Sayers won the fight, which was reportedly rigged by the SER for £1,000. The company was accused of "aiding and abetting a breach of the peace".

Branches from Rye
In 1846, a short branch was proposed from Rye station towards Rye Harbour. The line opened in March 1854. It was almost derelict by 1955, and closed on 29 January 1960.

The Rye and Camber Tramway was a separate  gauge line the other side of the river. It was proposed in 1895 and funded with a £2,800 capital. A  section from Rye to Golf Links Halt opened on 13 July 1895, followed by a  extension to Camber Sands, opening on 13 July 1908. The line was closed in 1939 following competition from bus services and was temporarily part-converted to road during the war. It was returned to railway after hostilities ended, but the line was impractical to repair to full use and hence closed permanently.

The SECR objected, and it was abandoned.

Branch to Dungeness and New Romney

The SER had tenuous plans to build a cross-channel passenger ferry terminal at Dungeness, which would provide a dedicated route from London to Paris. In 1859, the Town Clerk of New Romney suggested a line should be built from Folkestone to Rye via Dymchurch and Lydd, but the SER was not interested. However, in 1866 they became favourable about a branch line from Appledore, as it could support their international train proposals. An Act of Parliament to build the line was obtained on 30 July that year, which included a branch to Denge Beach. On 5 August 1873, the SER were authorized to extend the line to Dungeness with a  pier and landing stage. Progress stalled on the line in the 1870s and the SER were in danger of a rival railway taking over construction.

The development of the artillery range at Lydd increased the potential for traffic, so the newly formed Lydd Railway proposed their own bill to work on the Appledore–Lydd branch line. Work began on 8 April 1881 and opened to Dungeness on 7 December that year. Most trains ran through to Ashford, though a few services terminated at Appledore. An act for the northward branch to New Romney was granted on 24 July 1882, with the line opening on 19 June 1884. The line was not a financial success, and the Lydd Railway was absorbed into the SER in 1895.

By the early 20th century, trains were running direct from Charing Cross to New Romney via Ashford and Appledore on summer Sundays. The branch line became important during World War I, when numerous Army camps were established on the shingle wasteland between Lydd and Dungeness. During this time, the line catered for both infantry and horse traffic. A passing loop past Appledore was removed in 1920. At the New Romney end, one of the sidings adjoining the station was extended to serve the Romney, Hythe and Dymchurch Railway.

The line was realigned to be closer to the coast in the 1930s, in order to attract holiday traffic along the coast between Dungeness and New Romney. The rerouted line opened on 4 July 1937, and included new stations at Lydd-on-Sea and Greatstone-on-Sea. At the same time, the branch to Dungeness was closed to passengers. By 1952, nine trains a day were serving New Romney from Appledore, with two further through trains from Ashford. After electrification of the South East main line in 1962, the direct services from Charing Cross were discontinued, and the remaining services were run on diesel-electric stock.

Later improvements
Hastings was poorly served by the railway, as many of the residential areas to the east of the town centre were some distance from the station. In 1872, the SER considered building a new station, but progress stalled until July 1886, when a local landowner offered £1,000 (£ in ) to build a station near Ore Tunnel. Ore railway station opened on 1 January 1888.

The original swing bridge over the River Rother east of Rye was proposed to be replaced by a fixed bridge in 1881. The SER were amenable to this as the Monk Bretton Bridge (that now carries the A259 east of Rye) was in planning stages, though the replacement bridge did not open until 1903. In 1899, the SER and the London, Chatham and Dover Railway created the South Eastern and Chatham Railway (SE&CR) as a joint operation.

In 1907, a steam railcar service was introduced on the line in an attempt to increase local traffic. Three additional halts were constructed between Winchelsea and Hastings; Three Oaks, Guestling (later renamed Doleham) and Snailham, all of which opened on 1 July. Snailham Halt was inaccessible by public road, and could only be reached by a rough track. The station was never modernised, and retained its original wooden platforms. Steam railcar services were withdrawn in February 1920 and replaced with tank engines. Snailham Halt closed on 2 February 1959.

Following World War I, plans were put forward to construct a chord linking the line eastwards at Ashford towards . This would allow trains to run between Hastings and Dover without having to reverse. The plans stalled at the design stage and the link was never constructed.

At the start of 1923, the SER, LCDR and SE&CR amalgamated with other railways to form the Southern Railway following in the Railways Act 1921. The line was electrified from Hastings to Ore in 1935, and electric services began on 7 July. This was done in order that trains could be serviced in a siding away from the centre of Hastings. The siding closed in May 1986. Electrification through to Ashford was planned, but abandoned in 1939 when the war started. It was revived for the Kent electrification scheme Phase 2 of the British Railways Modernisation Plan in the early 1960s, which included some preparatory work such as a footbridge at Rye. The plans were later dropped.

A regular hourly service was introduced in 1959, with additional peak services. This schedule has been largely unchanged.

Threatened closure

The line was recommended for closure by Dr. Richard Beeching in the 1963 Beeching Report as it attracted less than 10,000 passengers a week. Like other lines threatened with closure, there was strong opposition, and the route survived because the nearby road network made it impractical to run a replacement bus service. The parallel A259 from Hastings to Brenzett had several level crossings over the line and a hairpin bend at Winchelsea, all of which remain as of the 21st century.

The local member of parliament for Rye, Bryant Godman Irvine made a significant Commons speech complaining about the decision to close the line. As well as the A259, he complained that a lack of rail service would hinder holidaymakers, prevent children from getting to school easily, and remove the potential profitability of being able to move freight via rail. To make a case against closure and save money, the main line was temporarily made single track between Appledore and Ore from June 1965, which lasted until September 1966.

On 23 February 1966, the Ministry of Transport confirmed the branch to New Romney would close to passengers, which it did on 6 March 1967. It was kept open for freight as far as a nuclear flask loading and unloading point just outside Dungeness. This branch continues to run a regular service for this purpose, and occasional special passenger trains have been run for rail enthusiasts. Shortly afterwards, John Morris, Parliamentary Under-Secretary of State for the Ministry of Transport, announced that the remainder of the line was under review and would not close without further advice. The decision to close was delayed several times and dragged on for the remainder of the decade. Transport minister Michael Heseltine said a condition of the line closing would be improvements to buses from Ashford to Ore.

In 1969, Railway Magazine announced the remainder of the line would close at the end of the year. In 1971, the Kent Messenger stated the same, as did The Times, which also reported the railway was losing around £130,000 a year. In December 1973, the Ministry of Transport announced that the closure would require review owing to a change in transport policy. On 31 July 1974, the ministry recommended the line for closure but stated that services would run indefinitely for the foreseeable future.

The line was single tracked between Appledore and Ore on 1 October 1979, leaving a passing loop at Rye, in order to reduce maintenance and operational costs. At Winchelsea, the down platform was removed; trains in both directions now stop on the former up platform. Line speed was reduced from 85 mph to 60 mph, but there are additional long term speed restrictions in place, including 40 mph between Doleham and Ore and 20 mph across a half barrier level crossing at Winchelsea.

After electric services from Tunbridge Wells to Hastings started running on 27 April 1986, the Marshlink line became only one of two non-electric lines in the south east. In January 1992, the Minister for Public Transport, Roger Freeman, announced plans for British Rail to start electrification by 1995.

Privatisation
Following the privatisation of British Rail, the line was operated by Connex South Eastern from 1996, later transferring to Connex South Central. After Eurostar services began stopping at Ashford International in 1996, direct services were introduced on the Marshlink line beyond Hastings to Eastborne and Brighton for the first time in 60 years.

By 1998, traffic on the line had improved by 20%. In 2000, Southern took over management, and pledged to invest £5 million in improving customer service across its network. However, the Marshlink line continued to attract criticism for its poor service and lack of modernisation; Norman Baker, MP for Lewes described it, after travelling on the Eurostar from Brussels to Ashford International, as "a 1954 diesel train, which shunts along like Thomas the Tank Engine at about 10 mph from Ashford to Hastings."

The line closed for nine weeks from January to March 2012 for essential repair work to Ore tunnel, which was at risk of seeping water. The embankment between Ashford International and Ham Street was repaired, and the bridges next to Doleham and Three Oaks were rebuilt. There was also maintenance to signals to increase train speeds along the line. Network Rail planned to complete the work before patronage increased during the summer. The lengthy closure was criticised by MPs whose constituencies the line ran through, who questioned why the entire line had to close in one go as opposed to individual sections at a time.

In May 2018, Southern announced the cancellation of the direct service from Ashford International to Brighton, with Marshlink services only extending to Eastbourne. The company defended the decision as it would improve capacity between Eastbourne and Hastings, and removing a 2 carriage diesel service from the electrified and often overcrowded Brighton – Eastbourne line, but their proposals were criticised by various councillors whose wards lay on the route.

Listed buildings
The Marshlink line contains several listed buildings along its route, which show architectural or historical merit.

Accidents and incidents
Accidents occurring at Ashford and Hastings stations are not covered.
 On 30 April 1852, driver John Hadley was killed at Ham Street station when he went to inspect a locomotive boiler which exploded as he approached it.
 On 27 December 1898, eight passengers were injured when a horse box was roughly shunted and collided with the passenger train it was to be attached to at Appledore.
 On 14 March 1980, an empty stock train comprising five Hastings Unit vehicles derailed at Appledore due to excessive speed through a set of points. The driver was killed. A motor coach was consequently withdrawn from service due to extensive damage.
 On 26 April 1984, a train carrying a nuclear flask on the Dungeness goods branch hit a car on an open level crossing close to Brookland. The occupants of the car did not suffer any serious injuries.
 On 24 January 2019, the Marshlink line was closed after a person was hit by a train. All services between Ashford International and Bexhill were cancelled for part of the day.

Rolling stock

Since the Marshlink line is not electrified, it uses different rolling stock from most of the nearby rail network. The line was originally operated by 4-4-0 locomotives. When the railmotor service was introduced, it used stock from Kitson and Company; following the failure of this service, the line switched to using a variety of tank engines. In 1962, Class 205 "Thumper" and Class 207s diesel units were introduced. Southern planned to withdraw this rolling stock after completing electrification of its remaining diesel lines, but the Strategic Rail Authority rejected the £150 million cost as prohibitive. Instead, the company introduced Class 171 "Turbostar" DMUs in 2003.

The diesel-only line prevents other rolling stock being used, including the Class 375 trains used elsewhere on the South East Mainline, and the Class 395 "Javelin" trains on High Speed 1. In the event of a breakdown, the lack of available Class 171s can mean disruption or cancellation of services. The Class 171s are maintained at Southern's depot in Selhurst, some distance away from the line. In November 2017, it was suggested that the line could use British Rail Class 802 electro-diesel multiple unit trains, allowing direct running between HS1 and Hastings. Damian Green, MP for Ashford, endorsed the suggestion as it would allow more services running from St Pancras to Ashford International generally.

Future
In 2015, Amber Rudd, then Member of Parliament for Hastings, campaigned for electrification works to start within the next two years. The aim is to reduce times to London from Hastings to 68 minutes, and from Rye to under an hour. This would require remodelling Ashford International station so the existing Marshlink line could connect to HS1, installing power systems, and adding a grade-separated diversion from Rye to the west, all in addition to requiring new trains. An alternative proposal was put forward in 2016 that involved hybrid overhead / battery powered trains, which would not require electrification on the Marshlink line. The two level crossings with the A259 have been criticised as being inadequate, and a decision would be required with the Highways Agency, who manage the road, as to what work is required to make the upgrades go ahead.

The Marshlink Action Group is a volunteer group set up in 2003 in the interests of passengers using the line. The group are concerned about the line's future, particularly the use of Class 171 DMUs. They have reported a high proportion of children and the elderly use the line compared to others in the south east, and that trains are now at capacity but there is no additional stock because of its state as an isolated non-electric line. In 2016, Rudd chaired a working group to look at short and long-term plans for upgrading the Marshlink line, including the potential accommodation of Class 395 rolling stock. A report from Network Rail suggested that third rail electrification would cost around £100–250 million, and overhead electrification would cost between £250 and £500 million.

In May 2018, the Department of Transport allocated £200,000 for further electrification design, with the possibility of completion in 2022 when the existing track life-expires. This could provide the possibility of travelling from Ashford to Hastings in 20 minutes.  In October, a proposal was chaired to build an additional platform at Ashford to support direct St Pancras – Rye services.

References
Notes

Citations

Sources

 
 
 
 
 
 )

External links
Route information
Railfuture article on the Marshlink line
Hastings to Ashford International – DEMU cab ride – Hastings Diesels Ltd
Marshlink trains Twitter feed

Rail transport in Kent
Rail transport in East Sussex
Transport in Hastings
Transport in the Borough of Ashford
Railway lines in South East England
Railway lines opened in 1851
Standard gauge railways in England
1851 establishments in England